is a former Japanese football player and manager. He played for Japan national team.

Club career
Totsuka was born in Tokyo on April 24, 1961. He joined Yomiuri (later Verdy Kawasaki) from youth team in 1979. The club won the champions in Japan Soccer League 5 times, JSL Cup 3 times and Emperor's Cup 3 times. This was golden era in club history. He also became a top scorer 2 times (1984 and 1990–91). In 1992, Japan Soccer League was folded and founded new league J1 League. However he lost opportunity to play after that. In 1994, he moved to Japan Football League club Kashiwa Reysol. He retired in 1995.

National team career
In December 1980, Totsuka was selected Japan national team for 1982 World Cup qualification. At this qualification, on December 22, he debuted against Singapore. He also played at 1982 Asian Games. In 1985, he was selected Japan for the first time in 3 years for 1986 World Cup qualification. This qualification was his last game for Japan. He played 18 games and scored 3 goals for Japan until 1985.

Coaching career
In 2006, Totsuka signed with Japanese Regional Leagues club FC Gifu. He managed the club and promoted the club to Japan Football League. However, he was sacked in June 2007. In September 2007, he signed with Regional Leagues club FC Mi-O Biwako. He managed the club and promoted the club to Japan Football League. In 2008, he moved to Regional Leagues club FC Machida Zelvia. He managed the club and promoted the club to Japan Football League. He promoted each club to Japan Football League for 3 years in a row. End of 2009 season, he resigned a manager for FC Machida Zelvia. In 2011, he signed with Regional Leagues club SC Sagamihara. However, he was sacked in May.

Club statistics

National team statistics

National team goals

Personal honors
Japan Soccer League First Division Top Scorer - 1984, 1990/91

References

External links
 
 Japan National Football Team Database
 

1961 births
Living people
Association football people from Tokyo
Japanese footballers
Japan international footballers
Japan Soccer League players
J1 League players
Japan Football League (1992–1998) players
Tokyo Verdy players
Kashiwa Reysol players
Japanese football managers
FC Gifu managers
FC Machida Zelvia managers
SC Sagamihara managers
Footballers at the 1982 Asian Games
Association football midfielders
Asian Games competitors for Japan